Ranshaw is a census-designated place located in Coal Township, Northumberland County in the state of Pennsylvania.  The community is located to the east of the city of Shamokin.  As of the 2010 census the population was 510 residents.

Demographics

References

Census-designated places in Northumberland County, Pennsylvania
Census-designated places in Pennsylvania